Nicetas (c. 335–414) was Bishop of Remesiana (present-day Bela Palanka, Serbia), which was then in the Roman province of Dacia Mediterranea.

Biography
Nicetas promoted Latin sacred music for use during the Eucharistic worship and reputedly composed a number of liturgical hymns, among which some twentieth-century scholars number the major Latin  Christian hymn of praise, Te Deum, traditionally attributed to Ambrose and Augustine. He is presumed to be the missionary to the barbarian Thracian tribe of the Bessi.

Because of his missionary activity, his contemporary and friend, Paulinus of Nola, lauded him poetically for instructing in the Gospel barbarians changed by him from wolves to sheep and brought into the fold of peace, and for teaching to sing of Christ with Roman heart bandits, who previously had no such ability. However, it is doubtful whether these barbarians really were barbarians, or whether their mention is only a poetical topos. Indeed, Paulinus, who wrote a quite classical Latin poetry, probably used existing poetical authorities. For Dacia, where Nicetas was from, the poetical authority was Ovid, although the Dacia (probably the province Dacia Mediterranea) of that time did not correspond with the Getia where Ovid had been banished to.

In 398, Nicetas made a pilgrimage to Nola to visit the grave of Felix of Nola.

Lengthy excerpts survive of his principal doctrinal work, Instructions for Candidates for Baptism, in six books. They show that he stressed the orthodox position in trinitarian doctrine. They contain the expression "communion of saints" about the belief in a mystical bond uniting both the living and the dead in a certain hope and love. No evidence survives of previous use of this expression, which has since played a central role in formulations of the Christian creed.

His feast day as a saint is on 22 June.

References

External links
 Encyclopaedia Britannica article
 A New Approach to Albanian History
 Illyricum in christian literature
 
 

330s births
414 deaths
5th-century Christian saints
Church Fathers
Christian missionaries in Europe
4th-century Roman poets
4th-century Latin writers
Illyrian people